San Pietro in Vinculis is a deconsecrated Roman Catholic church in Naples. It is sited in the historic city centre on via Sedile di Porto, near via Mezzocannone.

It was built in the 15th century to plans by Angelo Aniello Fiore, though its present appearance reflects its extension in the 16th century by professor Giovanni Lucio Scoppa to house a new school for poor children. It was restored in 1654 according to a plaque behind the high altar. Part of the structure is now private accommodations.

References

Former churches in Naples
15th-century establishments in Italy
15th-century Roman Catholic church buildings in Italy